Peter Laughlin (born 5 March 1956) is a former Australian rules footballer who played with Richmond in the Victorian Football League (VFL) and Norwood in the South Australian Football League.

Notes

External links 

Living people
1956 births
Australian rules footballers from Victoria (Australia)
Richmond Football Club players
Norwood Football Club players